The Vale Hotel and Grand Opera House is a historic property in Vale, Oregon.

Description and history
The Vale Hotel, originally the US National Bank and Drexel Hotel or Drexel Hotel, was built in 1907–1908. The adjacent Grand Central Saloon is believed to have been constructed . The saloon was altered, about the same time as the hotel was built, into the Vale Grand Opera House. The property was listed on the National Register of Historic Places on August 1, 1984.

See also
 Historic preservation
 History of banking in the United States
 List of Oregon's Most Endangered Places
 National Register of Historic Places listings in Malheur County, Oregon
 Oregon Country

Photo gallery

References

External links

 
 

Buildings and structures in Malheur County, Oregon
Hotel buildings completed in 1896
Hotel buildings on the National Register of Historic Places in Oregon
Italianate architecture in Oregon
Music venues completed in 1896
National Register of Historic Places in Malheur County, Oregon
Opera houses in Oregon
Oregon's Most Endangered Places
Romanesque Revival architecture in Oregon
Theatres completed in 1896
Vale, Oregon